Lovosice is a town in Litoměřice District in the Ústí nad Labem Region of the Czech Republic. It has about 8,600 inhabitants. It is an industrial town.

Geography
It lies mostly in the Lower Eger Table. The town is situated on the left bank of the Elbe River, which forms the northern municipal border.

History

The region of Lovosice was inhabited already in the Bronze Age. Some evidence indicates that the first Czechs lived right here.

The first mention of Lovosice is from 1143. Duke Vladislaus II gave this small village to the Strahov monastery. Emperor Rudolf II promoted the village to a town in 1600.

Lovosice was 1756 the site of a major battle between Prussia and the Austrian empire, at the Battle of Lobositz. 

In 1850, the railroad was built, which supported the industrialization of the town and accelerated development.

During World War II, due to the Munich Agreement, Lovosice fell within a German occupation zone, commonly called Sudetenland. Only 600 Czechs stayed in the town at that time. After the war, the German population was expelled as a result of the Beneš decrees.

Demographics

Economy
Lovosice is known as an industrial town with a long tradition of chemical and food-processing industries.

Transport
Due to its strategic location, Lovosice is a significant transport junction. Besides a cargo port on the Elbe River, the town has a great connection to Prague and Germany via the D8 motorway and high speed railway Prague–Ústí nad Labem–Dresden.

Sights

The former town hall is one of the most valuable buildings in the town. It was built in the Art Nouveau style in 1906–1907. Today it serves as a library and tourist information office.

The Renaissance castle in Lovosice was built in the second half of the 16th century. After a fire in 1809, it was Baroquely modified and served as an archive and office. Today the building houses a secondary vocational school.

The Baroque Church of Saint Wenceslaus was built in 1733–1748 on a place of former wooden church. It contains valuable frescoes and an altarpiece Saint Wenceslaus.

Notable people
Karl von Czyhlarz (1833–1914), Bohemian-Austrian jurist and politician
Alfons Dopsch (1868–1953), Austrian historian

Twin towns – sister cities

Lovosice is twinned with:
 Coswig, Germany

References

External links

Cities and towns in the Czech Republic
Populated places in Litoměřice District
Populated riverside places in the Czech Republic
Populated places on the Elbe